The 1937–38 season was Stoke City's 38th season in the Football League and the 24th in the First Division.

It was a very up and down season for Stoke as they began well beating Derby County 8–1 in September to take them to the top of the table. However the season was dominated by a contract dispute between the board of directors and that of Stanley Matthews. Stoke's form dropped and they ended up being in a relegation fight which was won thanks to a 2–0 victory over Liverpool on the final day of the season.

Season review

League
The family atmosphere within the club was still thriving, with the directors encouraging players to pay a 'thrift scheme' which would help the club financially but they received a major jolt when Stanley Matthews disputed the level of benefit to which he was entitled at the end of the season. Matthews did in fact refuse to re-sign for the new campaign stating that a player of his standing should receive the full £650 benefit rather than the normal £500. As a result Stoke held him to his previous contract and Matthews was 21 days over the deadline before signing.

There were no major close season transfers, either in or out of the club but like previous seasons this proved to be no bad thing as the 1937–38 season got under way and, after a fine 8–1 victory over Derby County in mid September Stoke climbed to the top of the league. Sadly though as in the past injuries again interrupted the managers team and formation plans as both Freddie Steele and Charlie Scrimshaw suffered long term injuries. In November 1937 Stoke accepted a £6,000 offer from West Bromwich Albion for Joe Johnson and in his place Bob McGrory selected Frank Baker. In October 1937 Stoke played Scottish champions Rangers in a benefit match for the victims of the Holditch Colliery disaster, raising £2,000 for the relief fund. A good sized crowd saw an entertaining 0–0 draw.

However in the league Stoke's form fell away and Stoke slipped down the table and their performances were of 'poor quality' according to the local paper. In February and March with relegation a distinct possibility McGrory went out and signed Clement Smith from Chester, brought back Tommy Sale from Blackburn Rovers and swapped veteran Harry Davies for Port Vale's Tommy Ward. Stoke's injury jinx continued and with one game left at home to Liverpool Stoke required victory to keep their place in the First Division. To add to the drama star striker Freddie Steele arranged to get married on the morning of the match, he made it to the ground on time and scored a vital goal as Stoke won 2–0 to remain in the top division.

However the season was dominated by the continuing frictions between Matthews and the club board and in February 1938 Matthews handed in a transfer request after a fall out with manager Bob McGrory. Around 4,000 Stoke fans met with the directors at the King's Hall to see the board of directors come to the conclusion that Matthews must not leave. Matthews refused and reiterated his request to leave. Stoke rejected his request and Matthews wrote to the local paper thanking the fans for there support and he forged an uneasy truce with the management and board. Matthews pledged to do his best for his home town club and he did so until 1947 when he joined Blackpool.

FA Cup
Stoke exited at the fourth round this season losing at home 2–1 to Bradford Park Avenue in a replay.

Final league table

Results

Stoke's score comes first

Legend

Football League First Division

FA Cup

Squad statistics

References

Stoke City F.C. seasons
English football clubs 1937–38 season